L. plicata may refer to:
 Laciniaria plicata, an air-breathing land snail species
 Leptoxis plicata, the plicate rocksnail, a freshwater snail species endemic to the United States

See also
 Plicata (disambiguation)